György Sebestyén (30 October 1930 – 6 June 1990) was a Hungarian-Austrian writer, radio dramatist and screenwriter.

Life 
Born in Budapest, Sebestyén grew up bilingual in Budapest – as was often the case at the time. He published his first novel in Hungarian. The ethnology graduate fled to Vienna in 1956 after the Hungarian Revolution of 1956, in which he had actively participated. From then on, he published in German. In 1963, Sebestyén became an Austrian citizen.

He was the editor of the cultural magazine Pannonia, financed by the province of Burgenland, and published by the province of Lower Austria.

Sebestyén died in Vienna at the age of 59.

Honours and prizes 
 1975:  
 1976: Anton Wildgans Prize
 1987: Decoration of Honour for Services to the Republic of Austria.
 1989:  of the Province of Styria.

Work 
Source:
 Die Türen schließen sich, 1957
 Der Mann im Sattel oder Ein langer Sonntag, 1961
 Die Schule der Verführung, 1964
 Flötenspieler und Phantome. Eine Reise durch das Tauwetter, 1965
 Anatomie eines Sieges. Blitzkrieg um Israel, 1967
Burgenland, wo sich die Wege kreuzen, 1977
Thennberg oder Versuch einer Heimkehr. Roman. Braumüller Literaturverlag, Wien 2010. .
 Albino, 1984
 Die Werke der Einsamkeit, 1986
 Reise durch das Tauwetter – Když nastala obleva, edited by Haimo L. Handl, mit einem Nachwort von Heide Breuer, Übersetzung aus dem Deutschen ins Tschechische von Helena Tesarikova. Illustrationen von Robert Petschinka. Driesch Verlag, Drösing 2013,

References

Further reading 
 György Sebestyén. Der donauländische Kentaur. Ein subjektives Porträt. Edited by Ingrid Schramm and Anna Sebestyen. Styria, Graz 2000.
 György Sebestyén: Leben und Werk. Edited by Helga Blaschek-Hahn. Styria, 1990.

External links 
 
 György Sebestyén on Austrian National Library

20th-century Hungarian writers
Austrian Freemasons
Anton Wildgans Prize winners
Hungarian emigrants to Germany
1930 births
1990 deaths
Writers from Budapest